Abu Ruh Muhammad ibn Mansur ibn abi Abdallah ibn Mansur Jamani (also  Gorgani), nicknamed Zarrin-Dast was an eleventh-century Persian oculist. 

Zarrin Dast means the Golden Hand in Persian, a reputable name for an eye surgeon. 

He flourished under the Seljuq sultan Abu-l-Fath Malikshah ibn Muhammad, ruling from 1072-73 to 1092–93. 

He completed in 1087–88, a treatise on ophthalmology entitled "The Light of the Eyes" (Nur al-ayun), in Persian.

Sources

Hirschberg: Geschichte der Augenheilkunde bei den Arabern (57 sq., Leipzig, 1905).
Adolf Fonahn: Quellenkunde der persischen Medizin (38-41, 1910. Includes summary of the treatise, based upon Hirschberg).

See also
List of Iranian scientists

Iranian ophthalmologists
Year of death missing
Year of birth missing
11th-century Iranian physicians